Ecdyceras is a genus in the Ascocerida doubtfully assigned to the Hebetoceratidae. It somewhat resembles Hebetoceras.

References

Prehistoric nautiloid genera
Ordovician cephalopods
Ordovician cephalopods of North America
Middle Ordovician first appearances
Late Ordovician extinctions